The 2016–17 Persian Gulf Pro League (formerly known as Iran Pro League) was the 34th season of Iran's Football League and 16th as Persian Gulf Pro League since its establishment in 2001. Esteghlal Khuzestan were the defending champions. The season featured 13 teams from the 2015–16 Persian Gulf Pro League and three new teams promoted from the 2015–16 Azadegan League: Paykan as champions, Machine Sazi and Sanat Naft. The league started on 25 July 2016 and ended on 4 May 2017. Persepolis won the Pro League title for the third time in their history (total 10th Iranian title).

Teams

Stadia and locations

Number of teams by region

Personnel and kits

Note: Flags indicate national team as has been defined under FIFA eligibility rules. Players may hold more than one non-FIFA nationality.

Managerial changes

Foreign players

The number of foreign players is restricted to four per Persian Gulf Pro League team, including a slot for a player from AFC countries. A team can use four foreign players on the field in each game, including at least one player from the AFC country.

League table

Results

Positions by round

Clubs season-progress

Season statistics

Top Goalscorers 

Last updated: 4 May 2017
Source: Soccerway.com
Source: PersianLeague.com

Hat-tricks

Top Assistants 

Last updated: 4 May 2017
Source: Varzesh3.com
Source: Iplstats.com

Clean Sheets 

Last Update: 4 May 2017
Source: varzesh3.com

Attendances

Average home attendances

Attendances by round

Notes:Updated to games played on 4 May 2017. Source: Iranleague.ir   Matches with spectator bans are not included in average attendances  Machine Sazi played their matches against Esteghlal Khuzestan and Gostaresh at Bonyan Dizel  Machine Sazi played their matches against Paykan, Saipa, Sepahan, Tractor Sazi and Zob Ahan at Shahid Bakeri  Saipa played their match against Esteghlal at Azadi  Saipa played their match against Persepolis at Takhti Tehran  Sepahan played their matches against Esteghlal Khuzestan, Padideh, Paykan, Persepolis and Siah Jamegan at Foolad Shahr  Tractor Sazi played their matches against Esteghlal Khuzestan, Foolad, Padideh, Paykan, Persepolis, Saba Qom, Sepahan and Siah Jamegan at Shahid Bakeri

Highest attendances

Notes:Updated to games played on 4 May 2017. Source: Iranleague.ir

See also
 Azadegan League 2016–17
 Iran Football's 2nd Division 2016–17
 Iran Football's 3rd Division 2016–17
 Hazfi Cup 2016–17
 Iranian Super Cup
 Futsal Super League 2016–17

References

Iran Pro League seasons
Iran